Utricularia bisquamata is a small annual carnivorous plant that belongs to the genus Utricularia. It is native to southern Africa, where it can be found in Angola, Lesotho, Madagascar, Namibia, and South Africa. It was originally described and published by Franz Paula von Schrank in 1824.

Description
It has a rosette of narrow leaves and wiry stems supporting racemes of flowers with two lips, white, pale violet or occasionally yellow. The upper lip is small with two or three lobes and the lower lip has two short lobes at the side and acentral lobe. The base of the lower lip has a patch of yellow which is variable in size. The traps, translucent, are developed in the roots.

Distribution and habitat
Utricularia bisquamata is native to southern Africa where it occurs in Angola, Namibia, South Africa, Eswatini, Lesotho and Madagascar, and forms part of the fynbos community. The typical habitat of this species is acidic, boggy soils in sandstone areas where it grows among mosses in wet places.

In cultivation
U. bisquamata is sometimes found in cultivation and germinates freely from seed. The cultivar "Betty's Bay" has larger, more colourful flowers.

References 

Carnivorous plants of Africa
Flora of Angola
Flora of Lesotho
Flora of Madagascar
Flora of Namibia
Flora of South Africa
bisquamata